Juan Mónaco was the defending champion, but lost to Ivo Karlović in the quarterfinals.

Philipp Kohlschreiber won the title, defeating Ivo Karlović in the final, 6–2, 7–6(7–4).

Seeds
The top four seeds receive a bye into the second round.

Draw

Finals

Top half

Bottom half

Qualifying

Seeds

 Michael Russell (first round)
 Pere Riba (first round)
 Víctor Estrella Burgos (second round)
 Facundo Argüello (first round)
 Nick Kyrgios (second round, retired)
 Miloslav Mečíř Jr. (second round)
 Mate Delić (qualified)
 Louk Sorensen (qualifying competition)

Qualifiers

Qualifying draw

First qualifier

Second qualifier

Third qualifier

Fourth qualifier

References
 Main Draw
 Qualifying Draw

2014 ATP World Tour
2014 Singles
2014 in German tennis